The  California lunar displays  are two commemorative plaques consisting of small fragments of Moon specimen brought back with the Apollo 11 and Apollo 17 lunar missions and given in the 1970s to the people of the state of California by United States President Richard Nixon as goodwill gifts.

Description

Apollo 11

Apollo 17

History 

The California Apollo 17 lunar sample display burned in a 1978 fire at the San Diego Aero-Space Museum. The damaged plaque is stored at the San Diego Air & Space Museum.

According to Moon rocks researcher Robert Pearlman, the California Apollo 11 display is also housed in the San Diego Air & Space Museum.

See also
 List of Apollo lunar sample displays

References

Further reading 

 

Apollo program lunar sample displays
Apollo program
Lunar science
Petrology